Kentucky Route 1618 (KY 1618) is a  state highway in LaRue County in the U.S. state of Kentucky. It begins at an intersection with U.S. Route 31E (US 31E). The highway heads east along Lincoln Parkway next to the junction with KY 210.

Major intersections

References

1618
Transportation in LaRue County, Kentucky